The 2009 Supertaça de Angola (22nd edition) was contested by Petro de Luanda, the 2008 Girabola champion and Santos FC, the 2008 Angola Cup winner. On home court, Santos beat Petro 2–0 to secure their 1st title as the away match ended in a 2-1 win for Petro.

Match details

First Leg

Second Leg

See also
 2008 Girabola
 2008 Angola Cup
 Santos FC players
 Petro de Luanda players

External links
 Match info at rsssf.com

References

Supertaça de Angola
Super Cup